César Castro may refer to:

 César Castro (diver) (born 1982), Brazilian diver
 César Castro (footballer, born 1966), Paraguayan football defender and coach
 César Castro (footballer, born 1983), Venezuelan football defender
 César Castro (swimmer) (born 1999), Spanish swimmer